Henrik Skoog (born 17 April 1979) is a Swedish middle distance runner.

He finished sixth in the 5,000m final at the 2006 European Athletics Championships in Gothenburg.

He won three bronze medals at the Nordic Cross Country Championships, reaching the podium in 2002, 2004 and 2006.

References

External links

1979 births
Living people
Swedish male middle-distance runners
Place of birth missing (living people)
21st-century Swedish people